All We Need may refer to:

 All We Need (Raury album), 2015
 All We Need (Rachael Lampa album), 2011